Elymnias caudata, the tailed palmfly, is a species of satyrine butterfly found in South India. Some authors consider this as a subspecies of Elymnias hypermnestra.

Description

This butterfly species are sexually dimorphic: males and females do not look alike. Males have black upperside forewings with small blue patches and mimic Euploea species, while the females mimic butterfly species of the genus Danaus.

Both sexes have the wings longer, proportionately to their breadth, and the tail at apex of vein 4 on the hindwing longer compared to Elymnias hypermnestra.
Upperside: Male differs from E. hypermnestra as follows:
the subterminal and preapical spots on the forewing white suffused slightly with dark scales; the terminal half of the hindwing tawny, more or less suffused with dusky black, which in some specimens forms a distinct border along the termen. Female similar to the female of E. hypermnestra, but the black more extended; veins 2, 3, and 4 on the hindwing broadly bordered with black. 
Underside: Female differs from E. hypermnestra in the more conspicuous broadly triangular white pre-apical patch on the forewing, and in the prominence of the broad tawny terminal half of the upperside of the hindwing, which shows through a pale, sometimes pinkish brown on the underside. Antennae, head, thorax and abdomen brown, paler beneath and much paler in the female than in the male.

Range
It is endemic to South India.

Life history

Food plants

 Cocos nucifera 
 Calamus pseudotenuis
 Calamus rotang
 Calamus thwaitesii 
 Phoenix loureiroi 
 Licuala grandis 
 Areca catechu
 Arenga wightii
 Livistona chinensis
 Phoenix spp.
 Caryota urens
 Phoenix loureiroi
 Licuala chinensis

Larva

"Spindle-shaped, slender, transversely rugose and clothed with short stout bristles...; head large, surmounted by two stout horns, sloping backwards, slightly branched at the ends; a pair of long straight caudal spines setose like the body; colour bright green with longitudinal yellow lines more or less distinct and two rows of large yellow spots tinged with green and sometimes tipped with black on the back; head dark brown, with a yellow cheek-stripe and frontal-line."

Pupa

"Suspended by the tail only, but in a rigidly horizontal position, regular with the exception of two small pointed processes from the head and an acute thoracic projection above them; colour bright green, beautifully ornamented with four irregular rows of large yellow spots bordered with red." (Davidson & Aitken quoted by Bingham.)

See also
 List of butterflies of India
 List of butterflies of Kerala

References

External links

Elymnias
Butterflies of Asia
Butterflies described in 1871
Taxa named by Arthur Gardiner Butler